Ustyugovka is a rural locality (a village) in Krasnovoskhodsky Selsoviet, Iglinsky District, Bashkortostan, Russia. The population was 38 as of 2010. There are 2 streets.

Geography 
Ustyugovka is located 76 km northeast of Iglino (the district's administrative centre) by road. Mikhaylovka is the nearest rural locality.

References 

Rural localities in Iglinsky District